Dorothy Kane is a Northern Irish international lawn bowler.

Bowls career
Kane won the triples gold medal at the 1999 Atlantic Bowls Championships with Margaret Johnston and Donna McNally.

Kane has also represented Ireland in the triples at the 2000 World Outdoor Bowls Championship.

She became an Irish national champion after winning the 1998 pairs with Ruth Simpson at the Irish National Bowls Championships bowling for the Moat Park Bowls Club. Subsequently the pair went on to win the 1999 British Isles Bowls Championships.

References

Living people
Female lawn bowls players from Northern Ireland
Year of birth missing (living people)
Bowls European Champions